The 2017 Scottish Challenge Cup final, also known as the Irn-Bru Cup final for sponsorship reasons, is a football match that took place on 25 March 2017 at Fir Park, between Dundee United and St Mirren. It was the 26th final of the Scottish Challenge Cup since it was first organised in 1990 to celebrate the centenary of the now defunct Scottish Football League and the fourth since the Scottish Professional Football League was formed. Both teams progressed through four elimination rounds to reach the final. The match was won by Dundee United 2–1, marking their first win in the tournament since its inception and their first silverware since the 2009–10 Scottish Cup.

Route to the final

The competition is a knock-out tournament and was contested by 52 teams from Scotland, Wales and Northern Ireland in 2016-17. Those participating were the 30 clubs that played in the 2016–17 Championship, League One and League Two of the Scottish Professional Football League along with the top four teams from the 2015–16 Highland and Lowland Leagues (East Stirlingshire, who were relegated from the SPFL, took the place of the Lowland League champions Edinburgh City, who promoted in their place). The top two teams from the 2015–16 Welsh Premier League and 2015–16 NIFL Premiership and the U20s squads of the teams competing in the 2016–17 Premiership were also invited to compete. For the first three rounds, the draw was divided into two geographical regions – north and south. These draws were seeded to avoid U20s teams and Highland and Lowland League sides from being drawn against each other. From round four onwards, the draw was regionalised to keep Welsh and Northern Irish teams apart.

As both clubs play in the Championship, they received a bye to the third round.

Dundee United

St Mirren

Match details

References

Scottish Challenge Cup Finals
Scottish Challenge Cup Final 2017
Scottish Challenge Cup Final 2017
Challenge Cup Final
3
Scottish Challenge Cup Final